The Bostalsee is a reservoir in the municipality of Nohfelden in the northern Saarland. It was created in 1979. The dam has a length of 500 metres. The lake is almost exclusively used for recreation. The hydropower from the stored water has been used since the end of 2013 to a small extent to generate electricity, especially to light the circular walk around the lake in winter. The southwestern part of the lake has been designated as a nature reserve.

Construction 
This major tourist project was initiated in the early 1970s by the head of the county council of St. Wendel, Werner Zeyer, who later became the minister president of the Saarland. The long term aim was to strengthen the tourist infrastructure in the county of St. Wendel in order to raise the number of tourists. In addition, the new waterbody was intended to extend the local recreation facilities and improve the ecology.

Basic data 
The lake has a surface area of 120 ha (1.2 km²), a volume of 8 million m³ and maximum depth of 18 metres. It lies at a height of about  within the Saar-Hunsrück Nature Park near . It is thus the largest artificial body of water used for recreation in southwest Germany. The lakeside villages are Bosen, Eckelhausen, Gonnesweiler and Neunkirchen/Nahe, and the Bostalsee Leisure Centre is run by the county. The dam impounds the waters of the Bos and the Dämelbach.

Gallery

See also 
 List of dams in Germany

Literature 
 Literatur zum Bostalsee in der SULB

Annotations

External links 

 Freizeitzentrum Bostalsee und Tourist-Information Sankt Wendeler Land
 Luftbild und Lageskizze, Segelclub Bosen
 Talsperre Bosen, Saarland
 Dokumentation von Zustand und Entwicklung der wichtigsten Seen Deutschlands der TU Cottbus, Teil 9: Nordrhein-Westfalen, Rheinland-Pfalz und Saarland (PDF-Datei; 562 kB)

Reservoirs in Saarland
Nature reserves in Germany
Dams in Saarland
Naheland
RBostalsee
1970s architecture
Sankt Wendel (district)